Pierre-Olivier Malherbe (1569–1616) was a French explorer from the city of Vitré.

Biography
Pierre-Olivier Malherbe went on 27-year world tour, and returned to France in 1609. He has a claim to being the first French circumnavigator. He visited China, and in India had an encounter with Akbar.

Upon his return, Pierre-Olivier Malherbe met several times with the French king Henry IV, to tell him about the gold and silver of the East Indies. He explained about the routes to reach these places, and offered to lead an expedition for the king.

Pierre-Olivier Malherbe may have been the author of a Malay language dictionary, which was added to François Martin de Vitré's work La Description du premier voyage fait aux Indes orientales par les Français en l'an 1603 in 1609.

He is mentioned in the 1629 Traité de navigation et des voyages de découvertes et conquêtes, principalement des François by geographer Pierre Bergeron.

In Paris, he also met with the Dutch linguist Erpenius, who was preparing the first Latin–Arab Dictionary.

See also
France-Asia relations

Notes

1569 births
1616 deaths
People from Vitré, Ille-et-Vilaine
French explorers
French expatriates in China
Vitré, Ille-et-Vilaine
Explorers of India
French expatriates in India
Explorers of China